Hogg Memorial Auditorium is a theater located on the University of Texas at Austin campus in Austin, Texas. The venue was the first theater at the university's campus when it was constructed in 1933.

References

1930s establishments in Texas
1933 establishments in the United States
Buildings and structures completed in 1933
Buildings and structures in Austin, Texas
University of Texas at Austin campus